Alloclita is a genus of moths in the family Cosmopterigidae.

Species
Alloclita brachygrapta Meyrick 1925
Alloclita cerritella (Riedl, 1993)
Alloclita coleophorella (Riedl, 1993)
Alloclita delozona Meyrick, 1919
Alloclita deprinsi Koster & Sinev, 2003
Alloclita francoeuriae Walsingham, 1905
Alloclita gambiella (Walsingham, 1891)
Alloclita insignitella (Riedl, 1993)
Alloclita haifensis Rebel, 1911
Alloclita mongolica Sinev, 1992
Alloclita paraphracta Meyrick, 1914
Alloclita plumbaria (Meyrick, 1921)
Alloclita recisella Staudinger, 1859
Alloclita reflua Meyrick, 1914
Alloclita subitariella (Riedl, 1993)
Alloclita xylodesma Meyrick, 1911
Alloclita zelotypa Meyrick, 1918

References
Natural History Museum Lepidoptera genus database
Alloclita at Afro Moths
Alloclita at Fauna Europaea

Antequerinae
Moth genera